A carminative, also known as carminativum (plural carminativa), is a herb or preparation intended to either prevent formation of gas in the gastrointestinal tract or facilitate the expulsion of said gas, thereby combatting flatulence.

Name

The word carminative is a derivative of Latin cārmen "card for wool", according to Hensley Wedgewood, on the  humoral theory that carminatives "dilute and relax the gross humours from whence the wind arises, combing them out like the knots in wool".

Varieties 

Carminatives are often mixtures of essential oils and herbal spices with a tradition in folk medicine for this use. Some examples for oils and spices with carminative action are:

 Agasyllis
 Angelica
 Ajwain
 Anise seed
 Asafoetida
 Basil
 Calamus
 Caraway
 Cardamom
 Cinnamon 
 Coriander
 Coscoll
Cnidium monnieri (She Huangzi)
 Cumin
 Dill 
 Epazote
 Eucalyptus
 Fennel
 Garlic
 Ginger
 Goldenrod
 Haritaki
 Hops
 Lemon balm
 Liquorice
 Lovage
 Marjoram
 Motherwort
 Muña
 Mustard
 Nigella
 Nutmeg
 Onion
 Orange 
 Oregano
 Parsley
 Pepper
 Pennyroyal
 Peppermint 
 Rosemary
 Saffron
 Sage
 Triphala
 Savory
 Spearmint
 Thyme
 Valerian
 Wintergreen
 Wormwood

Modern drugs used for the same purpose include simethicone, which simply lowers the surface tension of gas bubbles rather than having physiological effects.

See also
 Antiflatulent
 Flatulence#Management
 Anti-foaming agent
 Dalby's Carminative

References

External links 

Biologically-based therapies
Drugs acting on the gastrointestinal system and metabolism
Flatulence